Jakir Hussain Sikdar is an Indian politician from Assam. He is a member of Indian National Congress.  He is an MLA, elected from the Sarukhetri (Vidhan Sabha constituency)   in the 2016 Assam state assembly election.  In the 2021 assembly election, he was re-elected from the same constituency.

Early life and education
He was born in Kuriha village, Kayakuchi in Barpeta. He completed his schooling at Kayakuchi H.S. School in 1996. In 2000 he completed his Higher Secondary from Kayakuchi H.S. School. He completed his graduation from Nabajyoti College, Kalgachia in 2014.

References 

Living people
People from Barpeta district
Year of birth missing (living people)
Indian National Congress politicians from Assam
Indian National Congress politicians
21st-century Indian politicians